Bunting is an unincorporated community in Sussex County, Delaware, United States. Bunting is located at the intersection of state routes 54 and 54 Alternate, east of Selbyville.

History
Bunting's population was 25 in 1890.

References

Unincorporated communities in Sussex County, Delaware
Unincorporated communities in Delaware